Macedonians (in ) in France form a small minority mainly concentrated in the capital Paris. Most of the immigrants originated from the Skopje, Bitola, Sloeštica, Struga, Ohrid and Kicevo regions. More still emigrated to France after the breakup of Yugoslavia. The French government estimates the number of Macedonians in France to be 2,300 while Macedonian figures put the number at over 15,000 people.

The names of 33 Macedonian soldiers killed fighting for France in World War I are inscribed on a monument in the Peace Park of Colombelles, Normandy.

Notable people
Aleksandar Damčevski - footballer
Evdokija Danajlovska - composer
Blagoja Dimčevski - violinist from Toulouse 
Zilber Karevski  - writer
:fr:Christophe Najdovski - politician
Jordan Plevnes - Writer and Ambassador
Stefani Sen Senar - writer from Paris
Paskal Sotirovski (1923–2007), astrophysicist 
Hristijan Šanev - painter from Paris

References

European diaspora in France
France